Roma (also known as Fellini's Roma or Federico Fellini's Roma) is a 1972 semi-autobiographical comedy-drama film depicting director Federico Fellini's move from his native Rimini to Rome as a youth. The film was directed by Fellini from a screenplay by himself and Bernardino Zapponi. It is a homage to the city, shown in a series of loosely connected episodes set during both Rome's past and present. The plot is minimal, and the only "character" to develop significantly is Rome herself. Peter Gonzales plays the young Fellini, and the film features mainly newcomers in the cast.

Plot
Federico Fellini recounts his youth in Rome. The film opens up with a long traffic jam to the city. Once there, scenes are shown depicting Rome during the Fascist regime in the 1930s as well as in the 1970s.

A young Fellini moves into a vivacious guesthouse inhabited by unusual people (including a Benito Mussolini lookalike) and run by a sick obese woman. He visits two brothels—one being dilapitated and overcrowded and the other one more stylish and luxurious—and seemingly falls in love with a prostitute working in the latter one. Other attractions in Rome are shown, including a cheap vaudeville theatre, streets, tunnels, and an ancient catacomb with frescos that get ruined by fresh air soon after the excavators discover it.

The most famous scene depicts an elderly solitary noblewoman holding an extravagant liturgical fashion show for a Cardinal and other guests with priests and nuns parading in all kinds of bizarre costumes. The film eventually concludes with a group of young motorcyclists riding into the city and a melancholic shot of actress Anna Magnani, whom the film crew met in the street during shooting and who would die some months afterwards.

Cast
 Peter Gonzales as Federico Fellini (age 18)
 Stefano Mayore as Federico Fellini (child)
  as Dolores, a young prostitute
 Britta Barnes
 Pia De Doses as Princess Domitilla
 Marne Maitland as guide in the catacombs
 Renato Giovannoli as Cardinal Ottaviani
 Elisa Mainardi as pharmacist's wife / cinema spectator
 Raout Paule
  as music hall compère
 Paola Natale
 Ginette Marcelle Bron
 Mario Del Vago as widowers' member at teatrino
  as widowers' member at teatrino

Uncredited
 Dennis Christopher as hippie
 Anna Magnani as herself
 Marcello Mastroianni as himself
 Feodor Chaliapin Jr. as actor playing Julius Caesar
 Alberto Sordi as himself
 Gore Vidal as himself
 John Francis Lane as himself
 Elliott Murphy as extra
 Federico Fellini as himself
 Cassandra Peterson

Historical contrasts and modern alienation
Fellini repeatedly contrasts Roman life during wartime Fascist Italy with life in the early 1970s. The wartime scenes emphasize the congregation of neighbors in Rome's public places, such as street restaurants, a variety show, and a bomb shelter. With the exception of hippies and a conversational scene with Fellini bemoaning the loss of Roman life with radical students, the analogous congregations of the 1970s are between automobiles and motorcycles. Fellini makes a comparison between the parade of prostitutes at wartime brothels and a fantasy runway fashion show featuring clerical garb and a papal audience.

Narrative devices
The plot (such as it is) centers on two journeys to Rome by the director. The first is as a young man in the late 1930s and early 1940s. The second is as the director of a film crew creating a film about Rome. The film alternates between these two narratives.

Deleted scene
During editing, a scene with Alberto Sordi was cut because it was considered too immoral and cruel. Sordi played a rich man sitting at a bar watching some poor children playing ball. A poor man, blind, sick and lame, comes to cross the street, preventing the rich man from viewing the scene. Alberto Sordi, annoyed, begins shouting insults at the blind man: "Get out of the way, you ugly old man! Get out!".

Release
The film was screened at the 1972 Cannes Film Festival but was not entered into the main competition. The film was also selected as the Italian entry for the Best Foreign Language Film at the 45th Academy Awards but was not accepted as a nominee. The film is currently available on DVD and Blu-ray through The Criterion Collection.

Reception
On the review aggregator website Rotten Tomatoes, Roma holds an approval rating of 67% based on 18 reviews, with an average score of 6.6/10. Roger Ebert of the Chicago Sun-Times gave the film four stars out of four; praising Fellini's direction in the film he wrote, "Fellini isn't just giving us a lot of flashy scenes, he's building a narrative that has a city for its protagonist instead of a single character." Ebert ranked the film 9th in his 10 Best Films of 1972 list.

See also
 List of submissions to the 45th Academy Awards for Best Foreign Language Film
 List of Italian submissions for the Academy Award for Best Foreign Language Film

References

External links
 
 
 
 Roma: Rome, Fellini's City – an essay by David Forgacs at The Criterion Collection

1972 films
1972 comedy-drama films
1972 multilingual films
1970s English-language films
1970s French films
1970s French-language films
1970s German-language films
1970s Italian films
1970s Italian-language films
1970s satirical films
1970s Spanish-language films
English-language French films
English-language Italian films
Films about film directors and producers
Films directed by Federico Fellini
Films scored by Nino Rota
Films set in Rome
Films shot in Rome
Films with screenplays by Federico Fellini
French comedy-drama films
French multilingual films
French satirical films
French-language Italian films
Italian comedy-drama films
Italian multilingual films
Italian satirical films
Italian-language French films
Latin-language films
Religious satire films
Spanish-language French films
United Artists films